Arthur Smith (4/17/1948 - 11/9/2018)  was an American poet whose work appeared in The New Yorker, "The Georgia Review," "Northwest Review," "Cutthroat: A Journal of the Arts," "Crazyhorse," "Southern Poetry Review,"  Hunger Mountain, and The Nation. He was a professor of English and Creative Writing at the University of Tennessee and lived in Knoxville, Tennessee with his three Keeshonden.

Awards
 1987 Pushcart Prize
 1986 Pushcart Prize
 1985 Norma Farber First Book Award, Poetry Society of America 
 1984 Agnes Lynch Starrett Poetry Prize
 1981 Discovery/The Nation, the Joan Leiman Jacobson Poetry Prize

Works
 "ARS POETICA", Enskyment

Anthology
 The New Bread Loaf Anthology of Contemporary American Poetry, 1999.

References

Year of birth missing (living people)
Living people
American male poets
Agnes Lynch Starrett Poetry Prize winners